Admiral Cruises was a cruise line that operated cruises on the Eastern and Western coasts of the United States. It was formed in 1986 as a merger of three small cruise lines and was acquired by Royal Caribbean Cruise Line in 1988. The brand was discontinued in 1992 and its ships were retired and sold.

History 
In 1986, Admiral Cruises was formed as a merger of three small cruise lines: Eastern Cruise Lines, Western Cruise Lines, and Sundance Cruise Lines. Each line only operated one ship. At its peak, it had a fleet of three ships, the Azure Seas, the Emerald Seas, and the Stardancer. In 1988, the cruise line announced it had ordered a new cruise ship called the Future Seas. Admiral Cruises merged with Royal Caribbean Cruise Lines in 1988. Shortly after the merger, the order for the Future Seas was transferred to Royal Caribbean and became the Nordic Empress when it was completed in 1990. In 1990, the Stardancer was transferred to Royal Caribbean becoming the Viking Serenade. In late 1991, Royal Caribbean decided to end the brand. The Azure Seas and the Emerald Seas were retired and sold off between 1991 and 1992.

Fleet

See also
Royal Caribbean Cruises Ltd.

References

Defunct cruise lines
Defunct companies based in Florida
Defunct shipping companies of the United States
Hospitality companies established in 1986
Companies disestablished in 1992
1986 establishments in Florida
1992 disestablishments in Florida